Michael Pangrazio (commonly credited as Mike Pangrazio) is an American art director in the feature film industry best known for his matte painting work on Raiders of the Lost Ark and The Empire Strikes Back. As traditional and digital matte artist, he created some of the most famous matte paintings in movie history. His best known painting is the Raiders of the Lost Ark warehouse interior set-extension at the end of the movie.

Career
After graduating high school Pangrazio worked as scenic artist for a television network, which was a euphemistic term for "bucket boy", as he was charged with cleaning paint buckets, dirty brushes and other menial tasks. He subsequently performed these tasks for a small Hollywood effects studio, before he met Joe Johnston of Industrial Light & Magic. It was through him that he was hired in 1978 at ILM. Lacking any experience, conceptual artist and matte painter Ralph McQuarrie taught him the craft of matte painting, a trade he learned in the course of three years.

The backdrops from most of the stop-motion shots from the Imperial Walker/Hoth sequence from The Empire Strikes Back (1980) were painted by Pangrazio. The final shot of the government warehouse from Raiders of the Lost Ark (1981) which was painted on glass by Pangrazio at Industrial Light & Magic, and combined with live-action footage of a government worker pushing the crate up the center aisle. The integration of the live action lighting and painted lighting effects is said to be the best matte painting achievement in filmmaking history. He was also responsible for the Indiana Jones and the Temple of Doom (1984) Pankot Palace, Cliff and the Village, as well as most Young Sherlock Holmes (1985) matte paintings.

After leaving ILM, Pangrazio co-founded Matte World Digital with Craig Barron in 1988. Barron and Pangrazio continued to work with the crew at ILM on notable matte-painting scenes in several classic feature films.

Pangrazio moved to Oregon with his family in 1994 in order to pursue his children's book illustration career. He contributed images to numerous book publications.

In 2004 Pangrazio returned to the film industry and joined a world leading visual effects studio Weta Digital in New Zealand as Art Director. He has since supervised such blockbuster installments as The Hobbit: An Unexpected Journey (2012) and Bridge to Terabithia (2007).

Personal life
Michael Pangrazio is single and has had two children, Nathanael Pangrazio and Natalee Pangrazio. Michael's former wife Lynda's father was author and speaker Jim Rohn.

Publications
Once Upon a Time: Treasury of Modern Fairy Tales
Glim the Glorious, Or, How the Little Folk Bested the Gubgoblins

Awards and nominations
Emmy for outstanding visual effects for By Dawn's Early Light in 1990.

Achievements
Star Wars (1977) - the tractor beam set.
Raiders of the Lost Ark (1981) - the final shot of the government warehouse was painted on glass by Michael Pangrazio at Industrial Light and Magic, and combined with live-action footage of a government worker pushing the crate up the center aisle. 
Indiana Jones and the Temple of Doom (1984) - Pankot Palace, Cliff, The Village (The Raider.Net article about the matte paintings)
Young Sherlock Holmes (1985) - The first digital matte shot was created by Pangrazio and Christopher Leith Evans. A stained glass window was painted in acrylics then scanned into LucasFilm's Pixar computer system for digital manipulation. The computer animated Stained-Glass Knight character (the first digitally created character in a motion picture) blended seamlessly with the window.

Further reading

References

External links
 Radio interview
 Interview with Pangrazio
 
 Roger Gibbon remembering Mike Pangrazio

Living people
20th-century American painters
American male painters
21st-century American painters
21st-century American male artists
Matte painters
Year of birth missing (living people)
20th-century American male artists